Erebus superba is a moth of the family Erebidae first described by Charles Swinhoe in 1908. It is found in the Indian state of Meghalaya and in Nepal.

References

Moths described in 1908
Erebus (moth)